The Long Bay-Okura Marine Reserve is a  protected area at Long Bay on the North Shore in the Auckland Region of New Zealand. It was created by Order in Council in 1995.

The shoreline of the Long Bay Regional Park and the Okura Estuary Scenic Reserve adjoins the marine reserve.

See also
Marine reserves of New Zealand

References

External links
Long Bay-Okura Marine Reserve at the Department of Conservation
Map of the reserve

Marine reserves of New Zealand
Protected areas of the Auckland Region
1995 establishments in New Zealand
Protected areas established in 1995